is a passenger railway station located in the city of Ageo, Saitama, Japan, operated by East Japan Railway Company (JR East) .

Lines
Ageo Station is served by the Takasaki Line, with through Shonan-Shinjuku Line and Ueno-Tokyo Line services to and from the Tokaido Line.

Layout
The station has one side platform and one island platform serving three tracks, connected by a footbridge, with an elevated station building located above the platforms. The station has a "Midori no Madoguchi" staffed ticket office.

Platforms

History 
The station opened on 28 July 1883. On 13 March 1973, when a labor union attempted to protest by causing train delays, thousands of commuters rioted at the station, assaulting station personnel and destroying equipment over a six-hour period. The station became part of the JR East network after the privatization of the JNR on 1 April 1987.

Passenger statistics
In fiscal 2019, the station was used by an average of 41,655 passengers daily (boarding passengers only).

Surrounding area
Ageo City Hall
Ageo Post Office
Ageo City General Hospital

See also
List of railway stations in Japan

References

External links

JR East Ageo Station

Railway stations in Japan opened in 1883
Railway stations in Saitama Prefecture
Takasaki Line
Shōnan-Shinjuku Line
Ageo, Saitama